"Sheesh! Cab, Bob?" is the sixth episode of the first season of the animated television series Bob's Burgers. "Sheesh! Cab, Bob?" originally aired on the Fox network in the United States on March 6, 2011. The episode was written by Jon Schroeder and directed by Jennifer Coyle. According to Nielsen ratings, it was viewed in 4.91 million viewers in its original airing. The episode featured guest performances by Kevin Kline, Steve Agee, Andy Kindler, David Herman, Jay Johnston, Jack McBrayer and Oscar Nunez. The title of the episode is a pun on "shish kebab".

Plot
Tina's 13th birthday is coming up, and Linda suggests to Bob that they should make it extra-special since she will become a teenager. Tina wants to have a party with a smoke machine and streamers and invite people from her class and more. She also wants the party to have a romantic moment with classmate Jimmy Pesto Jr., the eldest son of Bob's business rival, nemesis, and owner of the restaurant across the street, Jimmy Pesto (Jay Johnston). Bob believes they can't afford what Tina wants, but Linda insists they must find a way. Bob asks the restaurant's landlord Mr. Fischoeder (Kevin Kline) for an extension on their rent. He refuses, instead offering Bob one of his side businesses so he can earn extra money as a taxi cab driver.

Bob accepts the offer while Louise becomes Tina's kissing coordinator as a birthday present to her to get ready for the expected kissing moment with Jimmy Jr. On the first night of his job, Bob starts to enjoy driving around the city, even befriending three transgender prostitutes: Glitter (Steve Agee), Marbles (Jack McBrayer), and Cha-Cha (Oscar Nunez). Tina starts inviting classmates to her party, including Jimmy Jr., who needs permission from his father for the R.S.V.P. Unfortunately, Jimmy Sr. forbids Jr. to come because of his rivalry with Bob, and Tina refuses to have a party without Jimmy Jr. Bob tries to talk sense into Jimmy Pesto, but Jimmy refuses unless Bob shaves his mustache and brings it to him as part of his collection. Tina disrespects him for his refusal to shave his mustache since he does not want to negotiate with the Pesto family.

After a night out with the sex workers, Bob drunkenly returns to the restaurant. Linda tells Bob that Tina agrees to attend the party, but only for a few minutes. Bob wakes up half an hour late for the party, and finds out it is not going well: the boys and girls aren't dancing, Gene in his role as the DJ and Mort working as the magician are appalling. Bob remembered that he invited not just his regular transgender customers but others, including another trans woman named Marshmallow (David Herman) and a homeless man (having invited all of them while he was drunk). Tina is disappointed in Bob for what he's done and refuses to talk to him. The trans women mention to Tina that Bob worked really hard for the party and reminds her that she has a good father who worked two jobs to pay for her party. She apologizes to Bob for what she said to him and lets him know that he already made the party perfect, even without Jimmy Jr. present. However, Bob has already shaved his mustache off. The trans women recognize Jimmy Sr. as one of their dates, known as "Baby Num Num", a "diaper lover." Bob brings the trans workers over to Jimmy's restaurant and threatens to publicly expose him about his personal dates and fetish. He concedes to Bob's demands; Bob keeps his mustache hair, albeit in a plastic baggie, and Jimmy Jr. is allowed to attend the party. Jimmy Jr. comes to the party, and Tina is grateful to Bob for what he has done. Tina and Jimmy Jr. kiss under the party's disco ball, with Louise's encouragement, and Gene plays the Thompson Twins' song, If You Were Here, creating a reference to the ending of the film Sixteen Candles. The episode finishes with everyone enjoying the party.

Reception
In its original American broadcasting, "Sheesh! Cab, Bob?" was viewed by an estimated 4.91 million viewers and received a 2.7 rating/4% share among adults between the ages of 18 and 49, an improvement from last episode and became the highest rated episode of the season to be aired after the first two episodes. Rowan Kaiser of The A.V. Club gave the episode an A−, saying "As funny as the episode is, it's also genuinely sweet by the end, with Bob and Tina bonding over how much work he's done. Of course, that just makes his drunken bender with sex workers that much funnier, as well as Louise acting as Tina's kissing coordinator and sending her to boot camp."

References

External links 
 

2011 American television episodes
Bob's Burgers (season 1) episodes
American LGBT-related television episodes
Transgender-related television episodes
LGBT-related animated television episodes
Television episodes about birthdays